The Talking Moose is an animated talking utility for the Apple Macintosh. It was created in 1986 by Canadian programmer Steven Halls. It is the first animated talking agent on a personal computer and featured a moose that would appear at periodic intervals with some joke or witticism.  The moose would also comment on system events and user actions and could speak what a user typed using the Moose Proof desk accessory.

Design
According to Halls, the original purpose of the moose was to make use of the Mac's Macintalk text-to-speech engine in a novel manner. A Doonesbury strip in which the characters were commented on by a talking computer provided inspiration, and Halls found that a moose head with antlers was recognizable even on low-resolution computer screens.

The moose was the first facially animated talking agent with lip synchronization and it became the seed idea for future talking agents, such as Clippy the paperclip in Microsoft Windows, Bonzi Buddy, and Prody Parrot from Creative SoundBlaster.

The Talking Moose used Apple's Macintalk software, the first version of which famously made the original "Never trust a computer you can't lift" speech at the Macintosh launch in 1984.  Apple's development of Macintalk had petered out and they granted Halls permission to use, and continue refining, the software for free. Halls did not just improve the fluidity of the speech and the reliability of the interpretation but gave the moose a library of comedic observations and wisecracks which gave it a distinctive character.

Around 1990, a version of the Talking Moose software was commercially published by Baseline Publishing. This commercial release of the Talking Moose included color graphics and additional software that allowed users to create and edit phrases to be spoken. A stripped-down version of the Baseline release of the Talking Moose was distributed with the Bob LeVitus book Stupid Mac Tricks in 1989.

In the 1990s, the Moose was rewritten by Uli Kusterer under the name Uli's Moose - for which he later obtained Steve Halls' blessing. This Moose was included in Bob LeVitus' iMac (and iBook) book "I Didn't Know You Could Do That".

Versions

Version 1.0 of the Talking Moose was released in 1986 by Steve Halls.

Version 2.0 was released in 1987, and ran on Macintosh systems 6.0.4 - 7.1. The Macintalk voice used for the Moose was 'Fred'.

Around 1990, Baseline Publishing commercially published the talking moose, and released version 4, introducing new characters from a "Cartoon Carnival" supposedly run by the titular ungulate.

Uli Kusterer - the next author of the moose - got rid of the cartoon carnival, and worked more in the spirit of the original moose, releasing new versions starting at 1.0, which supported Mac OS 7.1 - 9.2. These were released initially on CompuServe, and later on the internet. He also developed the first OS X native version (v 3.0). The latest Macintosh version of the Moose (v3.5.7) works with all versions of OS X, 10.3 through 10.7, and includes Universal Binaries.

From January 8, 2009, The Talking Moose has been posting periodic comments to a Twitter account. The account was banned, but has since been reinstated.

Halls recreated the Talking Moose for Microsoft Windows. The new Moose is positive, focusing on assistance and self-help topics like weight loss, smoking cessation, and anxiety/stress reduction.

References

External links
 The old Talking Moose web page by Steve Halls
 The new Talking Moose web page by Steve Halls
 Uli's Talking Moose for Macintosh

1986 software
Apple Inc. software
Fictional deer and moose
MacOS
Proprietary software
Novelty software